The 2018 season was Orlando Pride's third season in the National Women's Soccer League, the top division of women's soccer in the United States. The team played its home games at Orlando City Stadium.

Roster

Transfers and loans

2018 NWSL College Draft

Draft picks are not automatically signed to the team roster. The 2018 college draft was held on January 18, 2018. Orlando had one selection.

In

Out

Match results

Preseason

National Women's Soccer League

Results summary

Results by round

Results

League standings

Media
The NWSL website and the Go90 app have the exclusive rights to streaming all games live on each of their platforms. In addition, the league has partnered with the Lifetime Network to air a "Game of the Week" on Saturdays for the 24-week Regular Season. The Pride were selected for 8 matches on the slate. The dates are:

Sat Mar 31 / 3:50 PM ET kickoff / Washington Spirit vs Orlando Pride
Sat May 12 / 3:50 PM ET kickoff / Portland Thorns FC vs Orlando Pride
Sat May 26 / 3:50 PM ET kickoff / Chicago Red Stars vs Orlando Pride
Sat Jun 23 / 3:50 PM ET kickoff / Washington Spirit vs Orlando Pride
Sat Jun 30 / 3:50 PM ET kickoff / Orlando Pride vs North Carolina Courage
Sat Jul 14 / 3:50 PM ET kickoff / Utah Royals FC vs Orlando Pride
Sat Jul 21 / 3:50 PM ET kickoff / Orlando Pride vs Seattle Reign FC
Sat Aug 25 / 3:50 PM ET kickoff / Orlando Pride vs Chicago Red Stars

Squad statistics

Goalscorers

Clean sheets

Honors and awards

NWSL Team of the Month

NWSL Weekly Awards

NWSL Goal of the Week

NWSL Save of the Week

Other awards

Notes

References

External links

 

 
 
 
 
 

2018 National Women's Soccer League season
2018
American soccer clubs 2018 season
2018 in sports in Florida